This table lists the regional organisations each country is a member of.

Table

List

References

Lists of countries
International relations